Silent Wedding is a 2008 Romanian comedy-drama film about a young couple who was about to celebrate their marriage in 1953, but they were ordered to desist by the occupying Red Army and Communist authorities because the Soviet leader Joseph Stalin had died the night before. Since they could not openly celebrate, the wedding-goers try to party in silence.

It was directed by Horațiu Mălăele.

Cast
 Meda Andreea Victor as Mara
 Alexandru Potocean as Iancu
 Valentin Teodosiu as Grigore Aschie
 Alexandru Bindea as Gogonea
 Tudorel Filimon as Haralamb Vrabie
 Nicolae Urs as Mutu
 Luminița Gheorghiu as Fira
 Ioana Anton as Smaranda
 Dan Condurache as Mardare
 Doru Ana as Cârnu
 Șerban Pavlu as Coriolan
 Catrinel Dumitrescu as Iancu's mother
 Puiu Dănilă as Ulcior
 Tamara Buciuceanu as Grandmother
 Victor Rebengiuc as Grandfather
 George Mihăiță as Valentin Gogonea
 George Chițu as Gogonică

References

External links 
 

2008 films
Films set in 1953
Romanian comedy-drama films
2008 comedy-drama films
2008 comedy films
2008 drama films